Virovo is a village in the municipality of Demir Hisar, North Macedonia. It used to be part of the former municipality of Sopotnica.

Demographics
Virovo is attested in the Ottoman defter of 1467/68 as a village in the vilayet of Manastir. The majority of the inhabitants attested bore typical Albanian anthroponyms.
 
According to the 2002 census, the village had a total of 151 inhabitants, all of whom were ethnic Macedonians.

References

Villages in Demir Hisar Municipality